= Kiss me, I'm Irish =

Phrase associated with St. Patrick's Day

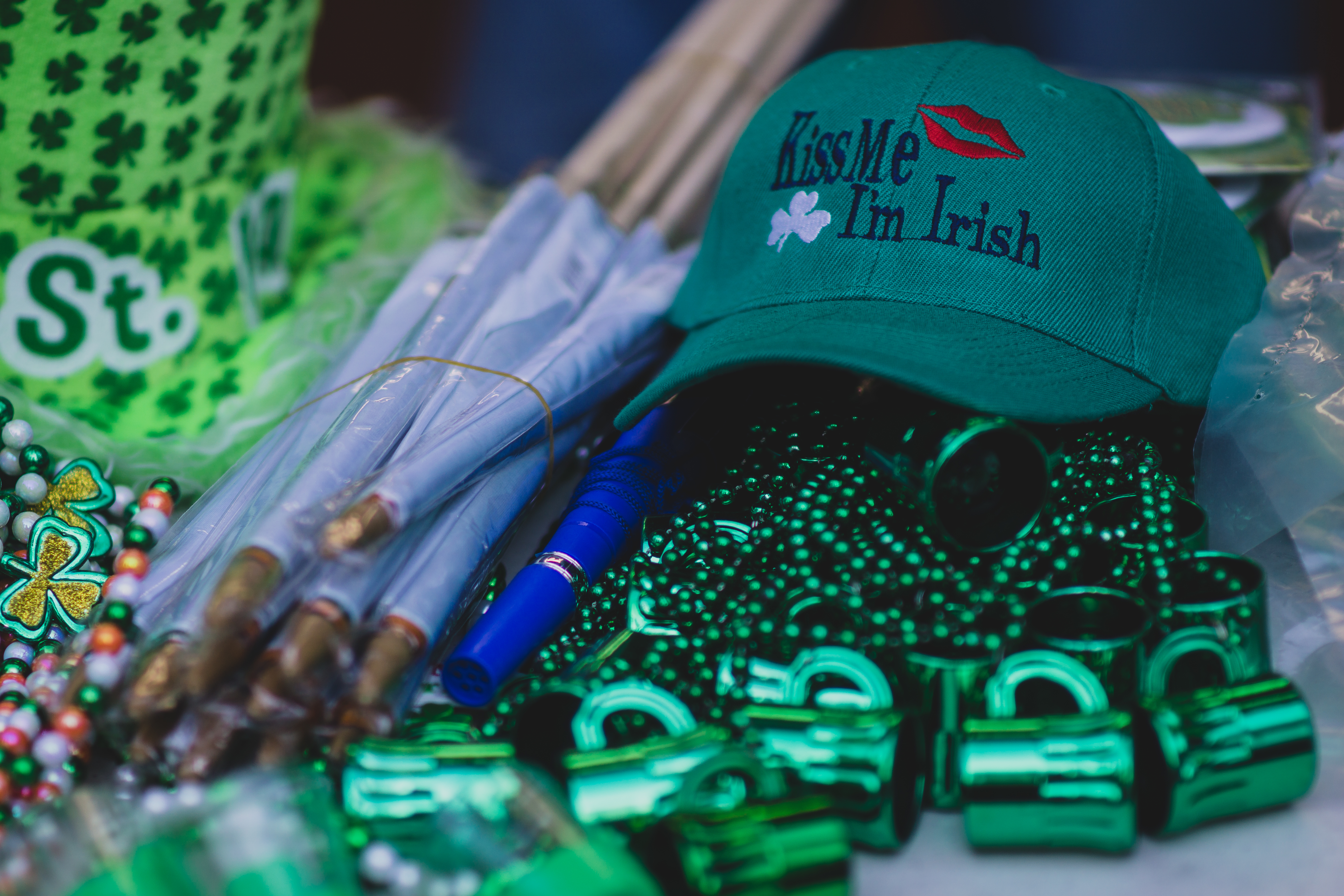
"Kiss me, I'm Irish" phrase on hat

Kiss me, I'm Irish is a common phrase associated with St. Patrick's Day. It often appears on T-shirts.
